Vinculum may refer to:

 Vinculum (ligament), a band of connective tissue, similar to a ligament, that connects a flexor tendon to a phalanx bone
 Vinculum (symbol), a horizontal line used in mathematical notation for a specific purpose
 Vinculum, a piece of Borg technology featured in the Star Trek:Voyager episode "Infinite Regress"
 Vinculum juris, a Latin phrase meaning "the chain of the law", which denotes that something is legally binding